Amodou Abdullei (born 20 December 1987) is a Nigerian-German professional footballer who plays as a forward.

Career

Early career in Germany
Aged 17 Abdullei left a football academy in Nigeria for Norway before joining German club SV Eintracht Trier 05 where he played in the Under 19 Bundesliga during the 2005–06 season. He moved to SSV Ulm 1846 in July 2007, to TSG Thannhausen in February 2008 but in November 2008, he was back at SSV Ulm. In May 2009, it was announced Abdullei would leave the club.

Belgium, Luxembourg, and Northern Cyprus
Abdullei scored three goals in four games for K.S.K. Beveren through March 2010. He was fined 100 euros and temporarily suspended for aggressive conduct at Waasland-Beveren, sidelined at home to Dender and traveling to Antwerp. During the 2009–10 Belgian Second Division, he made 11 appearances and scored tree goals.

Abdullei played for F91 Dudelange from 2010 to 2012.

In late September 2012, he moved to German fifth-tier side Borussia Neunkirchen. In March 2014, having been without a club for a year and having trained with Blackpool und bei Charlton Athletic in England, he signed with SV Mehring, also of the Oberliga. He scored twice on his debut.

Abdullei moved to Luxembourg National Division club UN Käerjéng 97 approaching the end of 2014, He put his first goal past Wiltz in their opener.

Having drawn interest from Küçük Kaymaklı Türk S.K., and Bostancı Bağcıl S.K. halfway through September 2015, the then 27-year old starred as Cihangir put three past Baf Ülkü Yurdu S.K., finally settling on the club in advance of the 2015–16 season.

In winter 2016–17 Abdullei returned to Luxembourg with second-tier side CS Grevenmacher and stayed the following season.

Return to Germany
Abdullei signed for TuS Koblenz, newly relegated to the Oberliga, in summer 2018.

In August 2020, Abdullei returned to SV Eintracht Trier 05 after 15 years.

References 

Living people
1987 births
Nigerian footballers
German footballers
German expatriate footballers
German sportspeople of Nigerian descent
Association football forwards
Luxembourg Division of Honour players
Regionalliga players
SV Eintracht Trier 05 players
SSV Ulm 1846 players
TSG Thannhausen players
K.S.K. Beveren players
F91 Dudelange players
Borussia Neunkirchen players
UN Käerjéng 97 players
CS Grevenmacher players
TuS Koblenz players
VfR Aalen players
Nigerian expatriate footballers
Expatriate footballers in Luxembourg
Expatriate footballers in Northern Cyprus
Expatriate footballers in Belgium
Sportspeople from Kano